In the card game bridge a pass-or-correct bid (or convertible bid), is a non-forcing bid that asks partner to pass or bid differently based on her/his holding. Pass-or-correct bids are generally used as responses to multiway bids.

A typical example is the 2 response on a multi 2 diamonds opening that asks partner to pass with a weak hand with long spades, or to bid three hearts with a weak hand and long hearts. This 2 bid implies length in hearts and denies length in spades.

Pass-or-correct bids that are made in a suit you don't hold when length in one of two suits has been shown by partner's bid, are also referred to as paradox responses.

Conventions using pass-or-correct bids
Multi 2 diamonds
CRASH
Suction convention
Mini-Roman 2 Diamond
Antispades Twos

See also
ParadoX Advances in Bridge

Bridge conventions